The Howe-Childs Gate House located at 5918 Fifth Avenue in the Shadyside neighborhood of Pittsburgh, Pennsylvania, was built circa 1861.  Originally "Willow Cottage", built for Thomas Marshall Howe, it is supposedly the oldest wood-frame house in Pittsburgh and the oldest existing house from the city's "Millionaire's Row."  Former owners of the clapboard Gothic revival/cottage style house include members of the Howe and Childs families, Mary Howe Childs, and also Michael L. Benedum.  The house is currently owned by Chatham University.  It was added to the List of City of Pittsburgh historic designations on April 16, 1986, and the List of Pittsburgh History and Landmarks Foundation Historic Landmarks in 2004.

References

Houses in Pittsburgh
Houses completed in 1861
Chatham University
1861 establishments in Pennsylvania